2003 24th convocation local councils of Republic of Belarus elections were held on 2 March.

General information 
24th convocation local councils of Republic of Belarus elections were held on 2 March 2003 under plurality voting. Official turnover was 73.4%. 23469 deputies of all levels were elected.

Results

References 
 http://rec.gov.by/sites/default/files/pdf/Archive-Elections-MS24-Sved4.pdf 
 https://www.svoboda.org/a/24160118.html

Local and municipal elections in Belarus
Belarus
March 2003 events in Europe